Tarapacáite is the mineral form of potassium chromate with the chemical formula K2CrO4. It forms bright yellow crystals and was discovered in 1878. It is named for the former Tarapacá Province, Peru; nowadays belonging to Chile. The boundaries between Peru, Bolivia and Chile were vague in the Atacama Desert before the War of the Pacific (1879–1883). Its type locality is Oficina Maria Elena, Maria Elena, Tocopilla Province, Antofagasta Region, Chile. It is unlikely to occur anywhere except in highly arid conditions as it is easily soluble in water.

References

Potassium minerals
Chromate minerals
Orthorhombic minerals
Minerals in space group 62